Prunus tangutica is a species of wild peach native to China. Based on its fruit traits it had been considered a wild almond, but genetic and morphological studies have shown that it is more closely related to Prunus persica, the cultivated peach, with its closest relative being Prunus mongolica. It is a very dense spiny shrub or shrubby tree, usually 1 to 2.5m tall but reaching 4m, preferring to grow on sunny slopes and alongside streams at 1500 to 2600m, but found as high as 3400m. Its flower petals are a pale pink, and its velutinous (velvety) fruit are green when unripe and purplishred when ripe. The fruits' mesocarps (fleshy exterior) splits when ripe, which led to it being classified as an almond for over a century, with the exception of Kovalev & Kostina in 1935, who assigned it to Persica.

References

External links
 

tangutica
Peaches
Trees of China
Endemic flora of China
Flora of Gansu
Flora of Sichuan